In mathematics, a signature matrix is  a diagonal matrix whose diagonal elements are plus or minus 1, that is, any matrix of the form:

Any such matrix is its own inverse, hence is an involutory matrix. It is consequently a square root of the identity matrix. Note however that not all square roots of the identity are signature matrices.

Noting that signature matrices are both symmetric and involutory, they are thus orthogonal. Consequently, any linear transformation corresponding to a signature matrix constitutes an isometry.

Geometrically, signature matrices represent a reflection in each of the axes corresponding to the negated rows or columns.

Properties
If A is a matrix of N*N then:
(Due to the diagonal values being -1 or 1)
The Determinant of A is either 1 or -1 (Due to it being diagonal)

See also
 Metric signature

References

Matrices